Luiz Fernando Ferreira Maximiano (born 8 May 1995), simply known as Luiz Fernando, is a Brazilian footballer who plays as a defensive midfielder for Al-Tadamon.

Career
Luiz Fernando began his career with Fluminense, spending time on loan with Vila Nova in Brazil, ŠTK Šamorín in Slovakia and Minnesota United in the United States.

In May 2019, he joined América Mineiro on loan.

References

External links
 
 

1994 births
Living people
Footballers from Rio de Janeiro (city)
Brazilian footballers
Brazilian expatriate footballers
Association football midfielders
Campeonato Brasileiro Série A players
Campeonato Brasileiro Série B players
Major League Soccer players
Primeira Liga players
Fluminense FC players
Vila Nova Futebol Clube players
FC ŠTK 1914 Šamorín players
2. Liga (Slovakia) players
Minnesota United FC players
América Futebol Clube (MG) players
C.D. Aves players
Expatriate footballers in Slovakia
Expatriate soccer players in the United States
Expatriate footballers in Portugal
Expatriate footballers in Kuwait
Brazilian expatriate sportspeople in Slovakia
Brazilian expatriate sportspeople in the United States
Brazilian expatriate sportspeople in Portugal
Brazilian expatriate sportspeople in Kuwait
Kuwait Premier League players
Al-Fahaheel FC players
Al Tadhamon SC players